Meitner may refer to the following:

 Meitner (surname), for people with that name
 6999 Meitner, main-belt asteroid
 Meitner (Venusian crater), a multiring impact basin on Venus
 Meitner (lunar crater), impact crater on the far side of the moon
 Meitner–Hupfeld effect, particle physics phenomenon

See also
 Hahn-Meitner-Institut, today part of Helmholtz-Zentrum Berlin